The Paguridae are a family of hermit crabs of the order Decapoda. This family contains 542 species in over 70 genera:. The king crabs, Lithodoidea, are now widely undestood to be derived from deep within the Paguridae, with some authors placing their ancestors within the genus Pagurus.

Acanthopagurus de Saint Laurent, 1968
Agaricochirus McLaughlin, 1981
Alainopaguroides McLaughlin, 1997
Alainopagurus Lemaitre & McLaughlin, 1995
Alloeopagurodes Komai, 1998
Anapagrides de Saint Laurent-Dechance, 1966
Anapagurus Henderson, 1886
Anisopagurus McLaughlin, 1981
Bathiopagurus McLaughlin, 2003
Bathypaguropsis McLaughlin, 1994
Benthopagurus Wass, 1963
Boninpagurus Asakura & Tachikawa, 2004
Bythiopagurus McLaughlin, 2003
Catapaguroides A. Milne-Edwards & Bouvier, 1892
Catapaguropsis Lemaitre & McLaughlin, 2006
Catapagurus A. Milne-Edwards, 1880
Ceratopagurus Yokoya, 1933
Cestopagurus Bouvier, 1897
Chanopagurus Lemaitre, 2003
Cycetopagurus McLaughlin, 2004
Decaphyllus de Saint Laurent, 1968
Dentalopagurus McLaughlin, 2007
Diacanthurus McLaughlin & Forest, 1997
Discorsopagurus McLaughlin, 1974
Elassochirus Benedict, 1892
Enallopaguropsis McLaughlin, 1981
Enallopagurus McLaughlin, 1981
Enneobranchus Garcia-Gomez, 1988
Enneopagurus McLaughlin, 1997
Enneophyllus McLaughlin, 1997
Forestopagurus Garcia-Gomez, 1995
Goreopagurus McLaughlin, 1988
Hachijopagurus Osawa & Okuno, 2003
Haigiopagurus McLaughlin, 2005
Icelopagurus McLaughlin, 1997
Iridopagurus de Saint Laurent-Dechance, 1966
Labidochirus Benedict, 1892
Lithopagurus Provenzano, 1968
Lophopagurus McLaughlin, 1981
Manucomplanus McLaughlin, 1981
Michelopagurus McLaughlin, 1997
Micropagurus McLaughlin, 1986
Munidopagurus A. Milne-Edwards, 1880
Nematopaguroides Forest & de Saint Laurent, 1968
Nematopagurus Milne-Edwards & Bouvier, 1892
Orthopagurus Stevens, 1927
Ostraconotus A. Milne-Edwards, 1880
Paguridium Forest, 1961
Paguritta Melin, 1939
Pagurixus Melin, 1939
Pagurodes Henderson, 1888
Pagurodofleinia Asakura, 2005
Pagurojacquesia de Saint Laurent & McLaughlin, 2000
Pagurus Fabricius, 1775
Parapagurodes McLaughlin & Haig, 1973
Phimochirus McLaughlin, 1981
Porcellanopagurus Filhol, 1985
Propagurus McLaughlin & de Saint Laurent, 1998
Protoniopagurus Lemaitre & McLaughlin, 1996
Pseudopagurodes McLaughlin, 1997
Pteropagurus McLaughlin & Rahayu, 2006
Pumilopagurus McLaughlin & Rahayu, 2008
Pygmaeopagurus McLaughlin, 1986
Pylopaguridium McLaughlin & Lemaitre, 2001
Pylopaguropsis Alcock, 1905
Pylopagurus A. Milne-Edwards & Bouvier, 1891
Rhodochirus McLaughlin, 1981
Scopaeopagurus McLaughlin & Hogarth, 1998
Solenopagurus de Saint Laurent, 1968
Solitariopagurus Türkay, 1986
Spathapagurus Lemaitre & Felder, 2011
Spiropagurus Stimpson, 1858
Tarrasopagurus McLaughlin, 1997
Tomopaguroides Balss, 1912
Tomopaguropsis Alcock, 1905
Tomopagurus A. Milne-Edwards & Bouvier, 1893
Trichopagurus de Saint Laurent, 1968
Turleania McLaughlin, 1997
Xylopagurus A. Milne-Edwards, 1880

References

External links

Hermit crabs
Taxa named by Pierre André Latreille
Decapod families